USNS Alan Shepard (T-AKE-3) is a Lewis and Clark-class dry cargo ship in the United States Navy. She is named for astronaut and Rear Admiral Alan Shepard (1923–1998), the first American in space and the fifth person to walk on the Moon.

The contract to build her was awarded to National Steel and Shipbuilding Company (NASSCO) of San Diego, on 16 July 2002. Construction began on 13 September 2005.  She was launched on 6 December 2006, sponsored by Laura Churchley, daughter of RAdm. Shepard.
She is part of the Pacific Fleet.

References

External links 

 

Lewis and Clark-class dry cargo ships
Ships built in San Diego
2006 ships
Alan Shepard
Bulk carriers of the United States Navy